Taxi Driver is a 1978 Indian Tamil-language film directed and written by N. S. Manian. The film stars Jaishankar, S. A. Ashokan, M. R. Radha and Sridevi. It was released on 18 August 1978, and emerged a success.

Plot

Cast 
 Jaishankar
 S. A. Ashokan
 M. R. Radha
 Sridevi
Praveena Bhagyaraj

Production 
Taxi Driver is Jaishankar's 150th film as an actor.

Soundtrack 
The music was composed by M. S. Viswanathan. The song "Santhi My Holy Angel" sung by Vani Jairam and S. P. Balasubrahmanyam attained popularity. The song "Idhu Raja Gopura Deepam Alla" is set in the Carnatic raga known as Revati, and "Sugamana Sindhanyil" is set in Bowli.

References

Bibliography

External links 
 

1970s Tamil-language films
Films scored by M. S. Viswanathan